Niharika Kareer is an Indian Punjabi film actress born in Delhi.

Early life  

She was born into a Punjabi family. She graduated from Delhi University. She practised fashion design, but her interest in acting developed when she got chance to be a part of a reality show. She received many offers to act in serials but decided to finish her education and then moved to Mumbai.

Career 

Kareer appeared in the reality show MTV Splitsvilla.  Her video, "Jugni furr", by Jasmeet, was a hit.

She made her Punjabi film debut in 2013  opposite singer Sharry Mann in Oye Hoye Pyar Ho Gaya, directed by Aditya Sood.

Filmography

References

External links 
 
 
 
 

Actresses from Punjab, India
Living people
Year of birth missing (living people)
Actresses from Delhi
Actresses in Punjabi cinema